Samir Bakaou  is a Tunisian football midfielder who played for Tunisia. He also played for Etoile du Sahel Al-Wahda, GAIS and Västra Frölunda IF

Record at FIFA Tournaments

External links

1954 births
Living people
Tunisian footballers
Tunisian expatriate footballers
Association football midfielders
Expatriate footballers in the United Arab Emirates
Expatriate footballers in Sweden
UAE Pro League players
Superettan players
Allsvenskan players
Al Wahda FC players
Västra Frölunda IF players
GAIS players